Tengku Ampuan Hajah Bariah binti Almarhum Sultan Hisamuddin Alam Shah Al-Haj (31 August 1933 – 21 March 2011) was the Tengku Ampuan Besar (Queen consort) of Terengganu from 1979 to 1998 as the wife of Sultan Mahmud Al-Muktafi Billah Shah. She was the sister of late Sultan Selangor, Almarhum Sultan Salahuddin Abdul Aziz Shah and the stepmother of the current Sultan Terengganu, Sultan Mizan Zainal Abidin.

Biography
Tengku Bariah was born on 31 August 1933 in Klang, Selangor, to Tengku Alam Shah of Selangor (later Sultan Hisamuddin) and his second wife, Cik Puan Kalsum binti Mahmud. She was educated at Malay School, Klang, Malay Girls' College (now known as Kolej Tunku Kurshiah), Kuala Lumpur, and then Cuckfield Park College, Sussex.

On 22 March 1951, she married Tengku Mahmud Sultan Ismail Nasiruddin, the then-Yang di-Pertuan Muda (Crown Prince) of Terengganu, in Kuala Lumpur. She was granted the title Tengku Puan Muda (roughly Crown Princess) on 7 April 1954.

In 1979, Tengku Mahmud became Sultan of Terengganu. She became the Tengku Ampuan Besar (Queen) on 20 September 1979. Her husband reigned until 1998, and was succeeded by her stepson Tengku Mizan Zainal Abidin.

After her husband's death, she became known as the Tengku Ampuan (Dowager Queen), while her mother-in-law, Tengku Intan Zaharah, became the Tengku Ampuan Tua (more senior title). She retained her position as a senior member of the Selangor royal court. She attended the coronation ceremony of her nephew, Sultan Sharafuddin Idris Shah on 8 March 2003.

Tengku Ampuan Bariah died on 21 March 2011 at Seri Kota Hospital, Klang, during her stepson's reign as Yang di-Pertuan Agong. She was buried at the royal mausoleum near Masjid Al-Muktafi Billah Shah in Kuala Terengganu, next to grave of her late husband. Her funeral was attended by the Yang di-Pertuan Agong, Tuanku Mizan Zainal Abidin, the Raja Permaisuri Agong, Tuanku Nur Zahirah, the Raja Perempuan of Perlis, Tengku Fauziah Tengku Abdul Rashid, the Tengku Puan of Pahang, Tunku Azizah Aminah Maimunah Iskandariah, and members of the Selangor, Johor, Kedah and Negeri Sembilan royal families.

Honours

Honours of Terengganu 

  Family Order of Terengganu : First Class (DK I, 16.9.1979)

  Order of Sultan Mahmud I of Terengganu : Member Grand Companion (SSMT)

  Order of the Crown of Terengganu : Knight Grand Commander (SPMT,26.6.1964)

Honours of Malaysia

  : 
  First Class of the Royal Family Order of Selangor (DK, 10.10.1985)

References

1933 births
2011 deaths
First Classes of Royal Family Order of Selangor
Malaysian people of Malay descent
Royal House of Terengganu
Terengganu royal consorts
Royal House of Selangor
Malaysian Muslims
People from Selangor
Daughters of monarchs